Bon Jovi is an American rock band which formed in Sayreville, New Jersey, in 1983 by five members, namesake Jon Bon Jovi (lead vocals, rhythm guitar), Richie Sambora (lead guitar, backing vocals), Alec John Such (bass guitar, backing vocals), Tico Torres (drums and percussion), and David Bryan (keyboards, backing vocals). Alec John Such was replaced by Hugh McDonald in 1994. Richie Sambora left the band in 2013 and was replaced by guitarist Phil X.
Among the numerous nominations, the band has won 1 Grammy Award in 2007 for "Who Says You Can't Go Home" with Jennifer Nettles, 2 World Music Awards, 1 Award for Merit in 2004 and 1 Brit Award for Best International Group in 1996.

American Music Awards

Billboard Music Awards

Billboard Touring Awards

Brit Awards

!
|-
|1987
|Bon Jovi
|International Group
|
|
|-
|1988
|Bon Jovi
|International Group
|
|
|-
|1989
|Bon Jovi
|International Group
|
|
|-
|1990
|Bon Jovi
|International Group
|
|
|-
|1996
|Bon Jovi
|International Group
|
|
|}

CMT Music Awards

Echo Awards

Grammy Awards

Helpmann Awards

Japan Gold Disc Awards

Juno Awards

Premios Oye!

MTV Europe Music Awards

MTV Video Music Awards

My VH1 Music Awards

Nickelodeon Kids' Choice Awards

World Music Awards

References

Awards
Lists of awards received by American musician
Lists of awards received by musical group